Reethapuram is a panchayat town in Kanniyakumari district in the Indian state of Tamil Nadu.

Demographics
 India census, Reethapuram had a population of 11,625. Males constitute 48% of the population and females 52%. Reethapuram has an average literacy rate of 80%, higher than the national average of 59.5%: male literacy is 82%, and female literacy is 78%. In Reethapuram, 11% of the population is under 6 years of age. It has a traditional church and it has a good Higher Secondary School, namely Providence Higher Secondary School, which is managed by the Holy Cross Sisters.

References

Cities and towns in Kanyakumari district